Gilberto Soriano (born May 13, 1945) is a Mexican sprint canoer who competed in the early 1970s. He was eliminated in the repechages of both the K-2 1000 m and K-4 1000 m events at the 1972 Summer Olympics in Munich.

References

1945 births
Canoeists at the 1972 Summer Olympics
Living people
Mexican male canoeists
Olympic canoeists of Mexico
Pan American Games medalists in canoeing
Pan American Games silver medalists for Mexico
Canoeists at the 2007 Pan American Games
Medalists at the 2007 Pan American Games